Islamic Culture and Communication Organization is one of the Iranian organizations which is affiliated to the Ministry of Culture and Islamic Guidance; and was established in 1995. Islamic Culture and Communication Organization's main responsibility is in the field of cultural activities (abroad the country). Mehdi Imanipour is the head of the organization.
Amongst the goals of "Islamic Culture and Communication Organization" are briefly as follows:

Expand/strengthen cultural relations with diverse nations and ethnic groups, particularly with Islamic-countries; providing situations for unity between Muslims of the world; correct-introduction of the school of Ahl al-Bayt at the subject of belief/jurisprudence/ethics; and so forth.

Members 
The Islamic Culture and Communication Organization has two pillars, consisting of the head of the organization and "the Supreme Council". Supreme-council is composed of 11 members who are appointed by the decree of Iran's supreme leader, Seyyed Ali Khamenei; including:

 Three scientific/cultural personalities which are chosen by the Supreme leader; Deputy of International Relations at Office of the Supreme Leader of Iran; and the head of the organization.
 Minister of Culture and Islamic Guidance (Chairman of the council) and minister of Foreign Affairs.
 Chief of the Islamic Republic of Iran Broadcasting.
 Islamic Development Organization's head.
 Secretary general of The World Forum for Proximity of Islamic Schools of Thought

See also 
 Islamic Development Organization
 Ministry of Culture and Islamic Guidance
 Islamic Development Coordination Council

References

Organisations under control of the Supreme Leader of Iran
Organisations based in Iran
Government agencies of Iran